Edinburgh West is a burgh constituency of the House of Commons of the Parliament of the United Kingdom, first contested at the 1885 general election.

Prior to the 2005 general election, the boundaries were the same as the eponymous constituency of the Scottish Parliament, which had been created in 1999.

This commuter belt seat, distinctively in the city, was Unionist/Conservative for over 65 years, from the 1931 general election until the 1997 general election, although the Liberal/SDP Alliance and later the Liberal Democrats repeatedly came close to winning in the 1980s and early 1990s. After 1997, the seat was held by the Liberal Democrats until the 2015 general election. The Member of Parliament (MP) between the 2015 and 2017 general elections was Michelle Thomson, who was elected for the Scottish National Party (SNP) in May 2015. In September 2015, she resigned the party whip and sat as an Independent. Thomson chose  not to seek reelection either for the SNP or as an Independent candidate. At the 2017 general election, Christine Jardine of the Liberal Democrats gained the seat with a majority of 2,988 votes.

The seat has been relative to others a marginal seat since 2005, as the winner's majority has not exceeded 8.2% of the vote since the 30% majority won in that year. The seat has changed hands twice electorally since that year and once through resigning the party whip.

Constituency profile
This is an affluent, left-leaning and pro-European seat covering the northwestern portion of Edinburgh. It is mostly suburban, but takes in rural areas within the council area including Kirkliston and South Queensferry. Edinburgh Airport and Murrayfield Stadium are within the seat.

Boundaries

The seat was created when the Edinburgh constituency was abolished, in 1885, replaced by four seats: Edinburgh East, Edinburgh Central, Edinburgh South and Edinburgh West. The Central constituency was abolished in 2005. The East constituency was abolished in 1997, but a new Edinburgh East was created in 2005. The South and West constituencies have been in continuous use (with alterations to boundaries) since 1885.

The Redistribution of Seats Act 1885 provided that the seat was to consist of the municipal wards of St. Andrew, St. Stephen, St. Bernard, St. Luke.

In 1918 the seat legally consisted of the Dalry, Gorgie, Haymarket and St. Bernard's municipal wards of Edinburgh.

Before the 2005 general election, the seat was one of six covering the City of Edinburgh council area. Five were entirely within the city council area. One, Edinburgh East and Musselburgh, straddled the boundary with the East Lothian council area to take in Musselburgh.

Constituency boundaries were revised for the 2005 election: Edinburgh West was enlarged, to include an area formerly within Edinburgh Central, and became one of five seats covering the city area.

From 1997 to 2007 the seat comprised the following wards: Cramond, Dalmeny and Kirkliston, Davidson's Mains, East Craigs, Gyle, Muirhouse and Drylaw, Murrayfield, North East Corstorphine, Queensferry, South East Corstorphine and Stenhouse.

As of 2007, as a result of the Local Governance (Scotland) Act 2004, none of the new Edinburgh wards were wholly within the constituency. Almond and Corstorphine/Murrayfield are almost entirely within it except for a small corner of each one. The constituency also includes a majority of Drum Brae/Gyle, a minority of Pentland Hills and small sections of Forth, Inverleith, City Centre and Sighthill/Gorgie.

Members of Parliament

Election results

Elections in the 2010s

Elections in the 2000s

Elections in the 1990s

Elections in the 1980s

Elections in the 1970s

Elections in the 1960s

Elections in the 1950s

Elections in the 1940s

Elections in the 1930s

Elections in the 1920s

Elections in the 1910s

Elections in the 1900s

Elections in the 1890s

Elections in the 1880s

 Caused by Buchanan's resignation to seek re-election as a Liberal candidate.

See also 
 Politics of Edinburgh

Notes

References

Westminster Parliamentary constituencies in Scotland
Constituencies of the Parliament of the United Kingdom established in 1885
West